"What Do You Mean?" is a song recorded by British rapper Skepta featuring British rapper J Hus that appears on Skepta's  studio album Ignorance Is Bliss. The song was written by Skepta, J Hus and Ayodele Oyadare (aka iO), and produced by iO.

Commercially, the song reached the top 20 in the United Kingdom and top 30 on the New Zealand Hot Singles Chart.

Charts

Certifications

References

2019 songs
Skepta songs
J Hus songs
Songs written by J Hus
Songs written by Skepta